The Nymphaeum is a partially preserved Roman public fountain in Amman, Jordan. It is located a short distance from the Hashemite Plaza, the Roman Theater and the Odeon, at the crossing of Ibn al-Atheer and Quraysh streets in al-Balad. Such fountains were very popular in Roman cities, and Philadelphia, as Amman was known by ancient Greeks and Romans, was no exception. This nymphaeum is believed to have contained a 600 square meters pool which was three meters deep and was continuously refilled with water.

History
The nymphaeum was built in the 2nd century CE, during the same period as the nearby theatre and odeon.

Restoration
In September 2015, archaeology students from the University of Jordan, Petra University and the Hashemite University as well as professional technicians, funded by the U.S embassy, started restoring the site. Their work consists in cleaning the structure stone by stone, and in replacing portions of stone lost due to erosion, cracking and flaking.

References 

Buildings and structures in Amman
Roman sites in Jordan
Buildings and structures completed in the 2nd century
Tourist attractions in Amman
Archaeological sites in Jordan